Łososina Dolna  is a village in Nowy Sącz County, Lesser Poland Voivodeship, in southern Poland. It is the seat of the gmina (administrative district) called Gmina Łososina Dolna.

The village has a population of 1,650.

References

Villages in Nowy Sącz County